Caernarfon was a constituency of the National Assembly for Wales from 1999 to 2007. It was one of nine constituencies in the North Wales electoral region until the abolition of the seat. The constituency elected one Assembly Member by the first past the post method, while the North Wales region elected four additional members, to produce a degree of proportional representation for the area as a whole.

Boundaries
The constituency was created for the first election to the Assembly, in 1999, with the name and boundaries of the Caernarfon Westminster constituency. It was entirely within the preserved county of Gwynedd.

The other eight constituencies of the region were Alyn and Deeside, Clwyd West, Clwyd South, Conwy, Delyn, Vale of Clwyd, Wrexham and Ynys Môn.

The constituency was abolished at the 2007 election. Part of the constituency then joined the new Arfon constituency, and part the new Dwyfor Meirionnydd constituency, both constituencies entirely within the preserved county of Gwynedd. The Arfon constituency is within the North Wales electoral region. The Dwyfor Meirionnydd constituency is within the Mid and West Wales region.

Assembly members

Elections

2003 Electorate: 47,173
Regional ballots rejected: 259

See also
 North Wales (National Assembly for Wales electoral region)
 National Assembly for Wales constituencies and electoral regions

References

Former Senedd constituencies in the North Wales electoral region
1999 establishments in Wales
Constituencies established in 1999
2007 disestablishments in Wales
Constituencies disestablished in 2007
Politics of Caernarfonshire